Abdulaziz Al-Qosair  [عبد العزيز القصير in Arabic] (born 5 May 1994) is a Saudi football player who currently plays for Al-Saqer as a forward.

References

 

1994 births
Living people
Saudi Arabian footballers
Al-Raed FC players
Al-Taqadom FC players
Al-Saqer FC players
Saudi Second Division players
Saudi Professional League players
Association football forwards